Jorge Manuel Catarino Madureira (born 5 February 1976) is a Portuguese retired footballer who played as a central midfielder.

Club career
Born in Matosinhos, Madureira joined FC Porto's youth system at the age of 10. In the 1993–94 season he made his debut with the first team, starting in a 0–0 home draw against S.C. Beira-Mar on 2 June 1994 in what would be his only competitive appearance.

Subsequently, Madureira played for Leça FC (Primeira Liga, only five matches) and Gil Vicente FC (Segunda Liga), spending the next two years with C.D. Aves in the second division. He returned to the top flight for the 1998–99 campaign, but only featured once for Académica de Coimbra – a 0–5 home loss to F.C. Alverca – who also suffered relegation as last.

In the following seasons, Madureira represented A.D. Esposende, F.C. Penafiel and Vilanovense FC, then signed a contract with second-tier club S.C. Salgueiros. After one year with F.C. Pedras Rubras in division three, he returned to Leça for three additional campaigns, helping the club to return to that level in his second year and retiring professionally in June 2008, at the age of 32.

International career
Madureira won 15 caps for the Portugal under-20 team, adding another appearance with the under-21s. He played all the matches for the former side at the 1995 FIFA World Youth Championship, in a third-place finish.

References

External links

1976 births
Living people
Sportspeople from Matosinhos
Portuguese footballers
Association football midfielders
Primeira Liga players
Liga Portugal 2 players
Segunda Divisão players
FC Porto players
Leça F.C. players
Gil Vicente F.C. players
C.D. Aves players
Associação Académica de Coimbra – O.A.F. players
A.D. Esposende players
F.C. Penafiel players
S.C. Salgueiros players
F.C. Pedras Rubras players
S.C. Dragões Sandinenses players
Portugal youth international footballers
Portugal under-21 international footballers